William Henry Balgarnie (12 May 1869 – c. July 1951) was a schoolmaster at Elmfield College, Woodbridge School and The Leys School, and was the inspiration for the character Mr. Chips in the book Goodbye, Mr. Chips, written by one of his students at The Leys, James Hilton.

Life
He was born at Woolwich, the son of a Presbyterian minister. Balgarnie studied at, and taught at Elmfield College before going to The Leys. In the 1890s he would gather with other Old Elmfieldians in London for a country walk followed by tea, which was invariably accompanied with recitations and ballads around the piano.

Balgarnie was the first Elmfieldian M.A. (1891),  and went from Elmfield to Fowey Grammar School, in Cornwall.

In 1894, Balgarnie was awarded a sizarship at Trinity College, Cambridge, from which he duly graduated with a first-class honours degree in classics. There he met W. W. Gibberd, a mathematician, through the Cambridge University Hare and Hounds, the cross-country club.

What must be unique to Balgarnie is that he was followed at Trinity by his elder brother, Edward, who entered Trinity in 1897 at the age of 30. 
From 1898 to 1900 he worked as an Assistant Master at Woodbridge school. And from 1900 till 1929 he was an Assistant and House Master at Leys school, and for one year he served as a Deputy Head Master (1929–1930).

He was associated with three universities: he had MAs from London and Cambridge, and had worked for a year or two as an assistant Professor of Greek at Glasgow University under the young Gilbert Murray. His academic output included translations of Sophocles, Euripides and Lysias. He edited classical works, including Xenophon Anabasis.

At The Leys School in Cambridge he was senior classical master, and, for a short period, deputy head master, over a period of more than fifty years.

He died at Porthmadog, Wales, after a heart attack.

Leysian links with Elmfield College
Sir Dyson Mallinson was a governor at both Elmfield and The Leys.

Balgarnie was educated at and himself taught at Elmfield. One Elmfieldian who followed him to The Leys was Harold Rose.

In popular culture
Among Balgarnie's students was James Hilton, who said he based the character Mr. Chipping in his novel Goodbye Mr. Chips on Balgarnie.

References

1869 births
1951 deaths
Alumni of Trinity College, Cambridge
Alumni of the University of London
Classical scholars of the University of Glasgow
Schoolteachers from London
English classical scholars
Greek–English translators